Non Stop Dancing is the debut studio album by the Congolese rumba band Zaïko Langa Langa. Produced by Mfumu Muntu Bambi, it was released on the Zaire Music label in late 1974.

It consists of songs recorded and released between 1973 and 1974, during multiple recording sessions of the band in Kinshasa. Prior to the album's release, Zaïko Langa Langa performed at the Zaire 74 music festival at the Stade Du 20 Mai, Kinshasa, along with other notable artists such as James Brown, B.B. King, Tabu Ley Rochereau, and Franco Luambo.

Background 
Shortly after Zaïko Langa Langa's debut in December 1969, the band established itself as the "third Congolese school of music". Because of their "rebellious" and "hippie" attitude and their innovative approach to Congolese rumba, they became a symbol of the new generations of post-independence Zaire, and are sometimes compared to the Rolling Stones for their appeal to the youth.

Before recording Non Stop Dancing, in 1973, while traveling from Brazzaville to Pointe-Noire, the band's drummer, Meridjo Belobi, pioneered the Cavacha drum rhythm. The Cavacha was later played by all Kinshasa bands and other African artists from all over the continent. Cavacha was also the name of a dance created by Evoloko Jocker.

Recording 
Recording sessions took place in 1973 ("Zania", "Mbeya Mbeya", "Eluzam" and "Zena") and 1974 ("Semeki Mondo" and "Mwana Wabi") in Kinshasa in various recording studios.

Track listing 
Side one

Side two

Personnel 

 Evoloko Jocker – vocals
 Papa Wemba – vocals
 Mavuela Somo – vocals
 Bozi Boziana – vocals
 Gina Efonge – vocals
 Bimi Ombale – vocals
 Manuaku Waku – lead guitar
 Teddy Sukami – rhythm guitar
 Oncle Bapius – bass guitar
 Meridjo Belobi – drums

References list 

1974 albums
Zaïko Langa Langa albums